North Carolina Highway 159 (NC 159) is a primary state highway in the U.S. state of North Carolina.  It serves as access to the North Carolina Zoological Park.

Route description
NC 159 is a two-lane highway that connects nearby highways to the North Carolina Zoological Park.

History
Established in 1975 as a new primary route, it went from the North Carolina Zoological Park to US 64/NC 49 in Asheboro.  In 1977, its southern terminus was moved to connect to US 220, creating an NC 159 Spur to the park.

Future
NC 159 Spur is planned to be extended west of its current terminus on mainline NC 159 to the US 64 By-Pass.  Construction on the new US 64 By-Pass began in 2016 and was completed in 2020, with the spur extension to begin at a later date.  The new connector will alleviate traffic for those going to-and-from the North Carolina Zoological Park.

Junction list

Special routes

North Carolina Zoological Park spur route

Established in 1979 when NC 159 was redirected south to US 220.  Its purpose is to connect the North Carolina Zoological Park with mainline NC 159.  Though not signed along its route, it is listed on state and county maps and is the only known spur route in North Carolina.

Junction list

References

External links

159
Transportation in Randolph County, North Carolina